Dumpagadapa is a village and panchayat under Akividu mandal located in the West Godavari district, Andhra Pradesh, India.

Demographics 

 Census of India, Dumpagadapa had a population of 5467. The total population constitute, 2769 males and 2698 females with a sex ratio of 974 females per 1000 males. 550 children are in the age group of 0–6 years, with sex ratio of 937. The average literacy rate stands at 69.74%.

Education
The village includes the V. V. Giri Government Degree College, founded 1974.

Archaeology
The village is located approximately 14 miles from Bhimavaram, and has a brick temple with a stone statue, dedicated to Varadarajasvami. The building was believed by Raj researchers to date to the 15th-16th century, and has a pillar with an inscription dated 1153 AD.

References

Villages in West Godavari district